Carénage  is a quartier of Saint Barthélemy in the Caribbean. It is located in the western-central part of the island and is one of the smallest quartiers on the island.

Populated places in Saint Barthélemy
Quartiers of Saint Barthélemy